Bryn McAuley (born June 7, 1989) is a Canadian actress. She is best known for playing Caillou on the television series of the same name, Anne Shirley on Anne of Green Gables: The Animated Series, Gina Lash in Angela Anaconda, Skye Blue in Carl², Becky Lopez in George Shrinks, Harriet in Franklin, Laney Penn in Grojband, Suzi in Camp Lakebottom, Quills in Numb Chucks, Amy and Samey in Total Drama: Pahkitew Island, Taylor in Total Drama Presents: The Ridonculous Race, Mavis Dracula in Hotel Transylvania: The Series, Eleanor in The Day My Butt Went Psycho! and Bea in Top Wing.

Personal life
McAuley began acting as a child, initially onscreen in various Canadian feature films, alongside fellow young Canadian actors Michael Cera and Alison Pill.

She lives in Toronto. McAuley graduated from Vaughan Road Academy alongside other performers like Drake and Sarah Gadon. In 2010, she co-founded the Young Emerging Actors Assembly, YEAA, with Eli Goree. YEAA is the youth committee at ACTRA Toronto, representing actors who play 17–30 in Toronto. McAuley went to Ryerson University (now Toronto Metropolitan University) from 2011 to 2015.

Career
Her acting career began when she was invited to try out for some roles when she was four; she was accepted into an agency and began to land several roles. However, she established her role as a voice actor after landing the role of Caillou in 1997. She has since received several other prominent roles such as Gina Lash on Angela Anaconda, Becky Lopez on George Shrinks and Laney Penn on Grojband. She has stated that two of her favourite roles are Quills in Numb Chucks and twin cheerleaders Amy and Samey in Total Drama: Pahkitew Island.

In February 2013, McAuley performed in a hit play called Claire from the Bus, written and directed by Kjartan Hewitt.

McAuley voices Mavis in the animated fantasy TV show Hotel Transylvania: The Series on Disney Channel.

Filmography

References

External links
 
 

1989 births
Living people
Actresses from Toronto
Canadian child actresses
Canadian film actresses
Canadian people of Scottish descent
Canadian people of Welsh descent
Canadian television actresses
Canadian voice actresses
Toronto Metropolitan University alumni
20th-century Canadian actresses
21st-century Canadian actresses